Mother or Woman (Finnish: Sillankorvan emäntä) is a 1953 Finnish drama film directed by Ilmari Unho and starring Helena Futtari, Aku Korhonen and Elina Pohjanpää. The film was shot between June 29 and August 17, 1958, in Läyliäinen, the village of Loppi, and the place used was a Forsbacka farm.

Cast
 Helena Futtari as Mailiisa Sillankorva  
 Aku Korhonen as Eetu Savela 
 Elina Pohjanpää as Johanna Sillankorva 
 Helge Herala as Jaakko Halla  
 Anni Aitto as Kreeta
 Eero Leväluoma as Tapani
 Salli Karuna as Anni Anttila 
 Alli Häjänen as Elli Anttila
 Tommi Rinne as Sillankorva's farm hand  
 Arvo Lehesmaa as Farmer of Halla  
 Topo Leistelä as Dean
 Laina Laine as Gossip woman
 Rosi Rinne as Gossip woman
 Aino Lohikoski as Gossip woman 
 Irja Elstelä as Gossip woman
 Uljas Kandolin as Janne, Johanna's father  
 Heimo Lepistö as Village man

References

Bibliography 
 Qvist, Per Olov & von Bagh, Peter. Guide to the Cinema of Sweden and Finland. Greenwood Publishing Group, 2000.

External links 
 

1953 films
1953 drama films
Finnish drama films
1950s Finnish-language films
Finnish black-and-white films